Scotland was a constituency of the European Parliament created in 1999. It elected between eight and six MEPs using the D'Hondt method of party-list proportional representation every 5 years from 1999 until 2020, when the constituency was abolished after the United Kingdom left the European Union on 31 January 2020.

Boundaries 
The constituency's boundaries were the same as those of Scotland, one of the four countries of the United Kingdom.

History 
The constituency was formed as a result of the European Parliamentary Elections Act 1999, replacing a number of single-member constituencies. These were Glasgow, Highlands and Islands, Lothians, Mid Scotland and Fife, North East Scotland, South of Scotland, Strathclyde East, and Strathclyde West.

The number of MEPs returned by the constituency was eight in 1999, seven in 2004, and six in 2009, 2014 and 2019.

After the result of the United Kingdom European Union membership referendum vote to leave the European Union in 2016, this constituency was abolished on 31 January 2020 following completion of the Article 50 withdrawal process.

Returned members

Election results 
Elected candidates are listed in bold.  Brackets indicate the number of votes per seat won.

2019 

1 On 15 May, David Macdonald, the lead candidate for Change UK in Scotland, switched to endorsing the Liberal Democrats in order not to split the pro-Remain vote.

2 Alyn Smith resigned his seat following his election to the Parliament of the United Kingdom in the 2019 United Kingdom general election, alongside Margaret Ferrier. He was replaced by Heather Anderson in January 2020.

2014 

† Ian Duncan resigned his seat in September 2017, to take up a seat in the House of Lords and be appointed as Under-Secretary of State for Scotland. He was replaced by Nosheena Mobarik later in the month.

2009

2004

1999

See also
Elections in Scotland

Notes

References

External links 
 Scottish Elections Between 1997 and present

Politics of Scotland
European Parliament constituencies in Scotland
1999 establishments in Scotland
Constituencies established in 1999
Constituencies disestablished in 2020
2020 disestablishments in Scotland